Hubert the Teddy Bear: Winter Games is a sports party game developed by Teyon for the WiiWare. It is available in the WiiWare Shop for 500 Wii Points.

Gameplay
Hubert the Teddy Bear: Winter Games is a party game offering 8 winter-related minigames including snowball fights and snowman building. Both single-player and multiplayer modes are available - players can compete in the Olympiad mode for up to 16 players. The game provides 3 levels of difficulty: child, youngster and adult. Players can also customize their characters by choosing genders, giving names or changing clothes.

Minigames

 Sledge ride - players have to hold the Wii Remote in a vertical position and move it up and down to gather speed. The goal is to collect gifts lost by a bunny.
 Playing on icicles - 5 icicles are visible on the screen and 5 buttons on the Wii Remote and the Nunchuk are associated with them. The player's task is to repeat a heard melody as precisely as possible.
 Fishing - players have to swing the Wii Remote or the Nunchuk and push a button displayed above a fish to catch it. Otherwise a fish will escape.
 Bunny chase - players have to wave the Wii Remote and the Nunchuk to catch a bunny running in front of players. Players need to jump to evade beams on a road or push the B and the Z buttons at the same time to slide under a branch.
 Making a snowman - players have to use the Nunchuk stick to move left or right and perform gestures or to push a presented button in order to make a snowman.
 Running up a hill - players have to wave the Wii Remote and the Nunchuk to run and to move it left/right to evade snowballs. When crashing with a frozen snowball, a teddy bear loses points. When pushing the Z button on the Nunchuk, a teddy bear speeds up, smashes a regular snowball and collects gifts.
 Snow fight - players push the A button to aim, swing the Wii Remote and push the Z button on the Nunchuk to throw a snowball.
 Decorating a Christmas tree - players choose decorations by pushing the A button on the Wii Remote and hang them on the tree in a marked place.

Reception
Hubert the Teddy Bear: Winter Games received mixed reviews, with an overall score of 75% from Gamer Pop, a 19/30 from Wiiloveit.com, a 5/10 from IGN, and a 5/10 from Nintendo Life.

References

External links
 Hubert the Teddy Bear: Winter Games's site at Teyon.com

2010 video games
Party video games
Multiplayer and single-player video games
Video games about bears
Video games about toys
Fictional teddy bears
Video games developed in Poland
WiiWare games
Wii-only games
Teyon games